Esfajerd (also Romanized as Esfājerd; also known as Isfajird and Safājerd) is a village in Kenarrudkhaneh Rural District, in the Central District of Golpayegan County, Isfahan Province, Iran. At the 2006 census, 8 families.

References 

Populated places in Golpayegan County